Miles Ramon Jackson-Cartwright (born April 7, 1992) is an American professional basketball player.

Amateur career

Early years
Miles Jackson-Cartwright started his amateur career in 1998 as a member of the San Fernando Valley Guardian Angels, an Amateur Athletic Union (AAU) sanctioned  basketball team coached by David Wooley. He continued the development of fundamental basketball skills in 1999 at HoopMasters, a nationally renowned AAU basketball program headquartered in Santa Monica, California and headed by coach John Fischer. Jackson-Cartwright completed his participation in AAU sanctioned events by joining California Supreme, a former Nike Elite Youth Basketball League (EYBL) team coached by Gary Franklin Sr. and Mike Law, in 2009.

High school
Jackson-Cartwright attended Loyola High School of Los Angeles, a Catholic institution for young men. He graduated with honors in 2010 and completed his high school career as a three-year starter on the varsity team. Jackson-Cartwright also served as the team's captain for three years and lead them to Mission League titles in 2008 and 2009. He was selected as the 2009 Mission League MVP and earned First Team All-Mission League honors in 2008 and 2010. Jackson-Cartwright earned First Team All-California Interscholastic Federation (CIF) honors in 2009 and 2010. ESPN selected him to their All-California team in 2009 and 2010 and he was picked to be a member of the IRN Sports All-California team in 2010. He also earned the Loyola High School Athlete of the Year Award in 2010.

College
Jackson-Cartwright attended the University of Pennsylvania (Penn) of the Ivy League after being heavily recruited by the school's coaching staff. At the time he was the highest ranked player by ESPN's basketball writers and other credible college basketball scouting services to ever commit to the Penn in its long and storied history. Miles was a four-year starter who served three seasons as a team captain. Jackson-Cartwright ended his career at Penn second all-time in minutes played (3,959), seventh in assists (358), ninth in free throws made (364), ninth in free throw percentage (81.3), tenth in steals (131), tenth in 3-point field goals made (155), tenth in 3-point field goals attempted (449), and thirteenth all-time in points scored (1,401). He won the Ivy League Rookie of the Week honors four times during his freshman season (2007–08). Jackson-Cartwright was selected as a Second Team All-Ivy League honoree and also won the Philadelphia Big 5 Cy Kaselman Award for the Best Free Throw Percentage in 2012–13.

A notable Jackson-Cartwright play is when he scored a three-point play on a dunk over three Princeton players including Will Barrett, a six-foot/ten inch center. The points were the last ones scored in the away game loss and the dunk made ESPN SportsCenter's Top Plays of the day on March 8, 2011.

Professional career
Jackson-Cartwright went undrafted in the 2014 NBA draft after his collegiate career ended. On July 23, 2014, he signed a contract to play basketball in the Netherlands for Aris Leeuwarden of the Dutch Basketball League.

In the 2015 offseason, he signed with Hanau White Wings of the German ProA, the national second tier.

Personal life
He is the younger brother of Alternative Rock singer/songwriter J Davey. Their younger brother, Parker, played point guard at the University of Arizona from 2014-2018. Miles appeared in the documentary At All Costs, for which Parker was one of the main subjects.

References

1992 births
Living people
Amateur Athletic Union men's basketball players
American expatriate basketball people in the Netherlands
Aris Leeuwarden players
Basketball players from Los Angeles
Penn Quakers men's basketball players
Point guards
White Wings Hanau players
American men's basketball players